The Commander of the Ukrainian Navy is the professional head of the Ukrainian Navy.

List of commanders

See also
 Admiral (Ukraine)
 Commander of the Ground Forces (Ukraine)
 Commander of the Air Force (Ukraine)
 Commander of the Air Defence Forces (Ukraine)
 Commander of the Air Assault Forces (Ukraine)

References

Ukrainian Navy
Ukraine
Ukrainian Navy officers